Jean Abdel-Nour (born 29 November 1983) is a former Lebanese basketball player. He had a successful 2002-03 season with Ghazir which led him to be signed by the Bluestars for the 2003-04 season. He stayed with the Bluestars until the 2008-09 season where he was the leading Lebanese scorer on the team averaging 16 ppg and 7.4 rpg. After the season finished Bluestars dropped from the first division, and Abdelnour subsequently signed a 4-year contract with Sporting Al Riyadi Beirut.  Abdel-Nour is also a member of the Lebanon national basketball team, with whom he competed with at the 2006 FIBA World Championship.

Awards and achievements 
 Lebanese Basketball League Champion 2013, 2014, 2015, 2016,2017,2019
 FIBA Asia Champions Cup 2011, 2017

References

1983 births
Living people
Lebanese men's basketball players
Basketball players at the 2006 Asian Games
Shooting guards
Small forwards
2010 FIBA World Championship players
2006 FIBA World Championship players
Asian Games competitors for Lebanon
Al Riyadi Club Beirut basketball players